The Century for Young People is a non-fiction history book written by Peter Jennings and Todd Brewster. This book is an adapted version of The Century, adapted by Jennifer Armstrong. The book contains over 200 pictures to depict the 100 years of history.

Criticisms
Although the book is targeted for children in the range of 8–12 years old, some people have raised the concerns that the book is too difficult for the targeted audience. Some adults have raised concerns over the content of the book. They have expressed concerns that the material found in the book is too graphic and obscene for children to read. Specifically, issues have been raised over the depiction of the first hand accounts found in the book, such as the descriptive stories of cannibalism during the famine period in the Soviet Union.

See also
 Peter Jennings
 Todd Brewster
 Jennifer Armstrong
 Lincoln's Gamble

References

1999 children's books
20th-century history books
History books about the 20th century
American non-fiction books
Children's history books